Boisgervilly (Gallo: Boéz-Jergaud) is a commune in the Ille-et-Vilaine department in Brittany in northwestern France.

Population

The inhabitants of Boisgervilly are known as Boisgervilliens in French.

Sights
The 19th-century church has an altar from the 17th century.

The chapel of St. Antoine was built in 1427.

See also
Communes of the Ille-et-Vilaine department

References

External links

Official website 
Mayors of Ille-et-Vilaine Association 

Communes of Ille-et-Vilaine